The Counter-Terrorism Act 2008 (c 28) is an Act of the Parliament of the United Kingdom which increased police powers for the stated purpose of countering terrorism.  The first reading of the bill was held in January 2008, and it received royal assent on 26 November 2008 following an episode of Parliamentary ping-pong on some of its most controversial issues.

Provisions of the Act
The Act as passed contains various notable provisions:
Removal of the prohibition on post-charge questioning.
Longer terrorism sentences.
A register and monitoring for those convicted  of terrorism related offences, similar to the Violent and Sex Offender Register.
Changes to some of the rules surrounding the use of "intercept evidence".
Powers to seize the assets of convicted terrorists.
Police will be able to remove documents from a property search to decide whether or not they need to be legally seized as part of an investigation.
Greater use of DNA samples, and powers to allow the police to take fingerprints or DNA from those subject to a control order.

Photographs of police officers in public places

Section 76 (Offences relating to information about members of armed forces etc.) came into force on 15 February 2009 making it an offence to elicit, attempt to elicit, or publish information "of a kind likely to be useful to a person committing or preparing an act of terrorism" about: 
a member of Her Majesty's Armed Forces,
a constable,
the Security Service,
the Secret Intelligence Service, or
Government Communications Headquarters.
Any person found guilty faces 10 years imprisonment and an unlimited fine. It is a defence for a person charged with this offence to prove that they had a reasonable excuse for their action (for example, a newspaper feature on police brutality or corruption).

There are exemptions for communications service providers, web caches and web hosting services.

Journalists who feared that this law would be abused by the police to threaten the taking of photographs of their activities staged a mass protest outside Scotland Yard in February 2009. Gordon Brown reaffirmed that the police have a legal right to restrict photography in public places, and stated "the law applies to photographers as it does to anybody else in a public place". The act however does not lay out restrictions for the photography of Community Support Officers as they do not hold the office of Constable.

The Parliamentary debate on this law was limited because in earlier versions of the Bill the offence of eliciting or publishing information "likely to be useful to a person committing or preparing an act of terrorism" only applied to people who were or had been members of Her Majesty's Forces, and not to the police. This was also the case throughout the debate in the Standing Committee.

An opposition amendment changing the phrase "of a kind likely to be useful to a person committing or preparing an act of terrorism" with the words "with the intention that it is useful..." was withdrawn after the Minister explained that the clause merely restated earlier laws applying to the armed forces on which there was already case law that made it more reasonable than it appeared.

The law against eliciting or publishing information "likely to be useful to a person committing or preparing an act of terrorism" was extended to encompass police constables in a raft of unscrutinized amendments that passed into the Bill at the end of the debate when the Parliamentary timetable (which had been voted on earlier in the day) expired.

When this clause was scrutinized in the House of Lords, and in all subsequent debates, no reference was made to the extension of the law to include police constables.

A Parliamentary written question about the policy regarding police preventing members of the public from taking photographs in public places hasn't been answered. But the Home Office issued a circular to the police in 2009 which reminds them that 'Legitimate journalistic activity (such as covering a demonstration for a newspaper) is likely to constitute such an excuse. Similarly an innocent tourist or other sight-seer taking a photograph of a police officer is likely to have a reasonable excuse.'

Post-charge questioning
A number of measures were linked to the debate about extending the detention period for those arrested under the Terrorism Act 2000. One of them was the introduction of questioning after charge under ss. 22 to 27. Such questioning was already exceptionally allowed under PACE Code C para.16 in order: to prevent or minimise harm or loss to some other person, or the public; to clear up an ambiguity in a previous answer or statement; in the interests of justice for the detainee to have put to them, and have an opportunity to comment on, information concerning the offence which has come to light since they were charged or informed they might be prosecuted. But post-charge questioning rarely happens in practice. However, in order to give the police and prosecutors confidence that they do not have to wait until the end of the detention period to make a charge, the 2008 Act allows them to resume questioning after charge. This idea may be especially important if a charge is made under the Threshold Test under the Code for Crown Prosecutors, 2010, para.5. These measures are not likely to have much impact since they involve dire problems of admissibility, given the circumstances of a pending trial which is meant to be controlled by a judge rather than the police. More likely, the police will seek adverse inferences from silence rather than responses to lengthy questioning.

Abandoned provisions

42 day terrorist detention without charge
The highest profile provision in the Counter-Terrorism Bill was a measure to allow terrorist suspects to be detained by police in England and Wales for up to 42 days before being charged (formally told what law they were accused of breaking).  This was a re-run of 90-day terrorist detention without charge debate that occurred in 2006 that was narrowly lost by a vote in Parliament.

The crunch vote on the issue occurred on 11 June 2008 with a 36 Labour MP rebellion that would have defeated the government had the Democratic Unionist Party block, who normally vote with the Conservative Party, not voted for it.  Allegations of a political bribe for these votes were denied.

The day after the vote, the Conservative front bench Home Affairs spokesman, David Davis suddenly resigned from Parliament in protest and won re-election to his seat in by-election in which none of the other main parties stood a candidate.

On 13 October 2008 this measure was dropped from the Bill by a vote in the House of Lords.

Rather than reverse this defeat with another difficult vote in the House of Commons, the Government drafted a Counter-Terrorism (Temporary Provisions) Bill that would stand "ready to be introduced if and when the need arises."

Secret coroner's inquests
A provision in the Bill to give the Government powers to certify that a coroner's inquest should be held in secret without a jury in the interests of national security or foreign relations raised enough opposition outside of Parliament that the measure was also dropped. These measures, however, reappeared in the Coroners and Justice Act 2009.

See also
Counter-Terrorism and Security Act 2015

References

External links
The Counter-Terrorism Act 2008, as amended from the National Archives.
The Counter-Terrorism Act 2008, as originally enacted from the National Archives.
Explanatory notes to the Counter-Terrorism Act 2008.
Counter-Terrorism Bill 2007-08 at the Home Office website
The progress of the bill at the UK Parliament website

United Kingdom Acts of Parliament 2008
Terrorism laws in the United Kingdom